Con Man or conman may refer to:

 Confidence man, a practitioner of confidence tricks
 Con Man (film), an American crime drama film based on the life of Barry Minkow
 Con Man (web series), an American comedy web series created by Alan Tudyk
 Freelance (1971 film) (Con Man in the United States), a 1971 British thriller film starring Ian McShane
 Rob Conway (nicknamed "The Con Man"), an American professional wrestler
 The Conman, a 1998 Hong Kong action comedy film

See also
 Confidence man (disambiguation)